Point-in-time recovery (PITR) in the context of computers involves systems, often databases, whereby an administrator can restore or recover a set of data or a particular setting from a time in the past. Note for example Windows XP's capability to restore operating-system settings from a past date (for instance, before data corruption occurred).  Time Machine for Mac OS X provides another example of point-in-time recovery.

Once PITR logging starts for a PITR-capable database, a database administrator can restore that database from backups to the state that it had at any time since.

See also 
 Continuous data protection

References

External links
 PostgreSQL Continuous Archiving and Point-in-Time Recovery (PITR)
 MySQL 8.0 Point-in-Time Recovery Using the Binary Log

Data management